Christopher C. Wilkes was chief judge for West Virginia’s largest judicial circuit, the 23rd Judicial Circuit, encompassing Morgan, Jefferson, and Berkeley counties. Wilkes was first elected to the court in 1992 and has served on the bench since 1993.  He has been reelected four times since, most recently in 2016.  On August 17, 2018 he announced his candidacy for the Supreme Court of Appeals of West Virginia Division 1.  He was not elected, placing third among ten candidates.

Education 
Wilkes received his undergraduate degree from West Virginia University and his J.D. from the Ohio Northern University College of Law.

Career
Wilkes has served as president of the West Virginia Judicial Association, co-chairman of the Youth Services Committee of the Court Improvement Board, and a member of the Judges Initiative Committee of the Business Law Section of the American Bar Association.

Before he was elected to the bench, Wilkes served as a judge for the cities of Martinsburg and Ranson in West Virginia from 1985 to 1993. He previously worked as an attorney in private practice in Martinsburg.

References

Year of birth missing (living people)
Living people
20th-century American judges
21st-century American judges
Lawyers from Martinsburg, West Virginia
West Virginia circuit court judges
Municipal judges in the United States